Horosedly is a municipality and village in Písek District in the South Bohemian Region of the Czech Republic. It has about 100 inhabitants.

References

Villages in Písek District